The RS Neo is a singlehanded British sailboat that was designed by Paul Handley and RS Sailing as a racer and first built in 2017.

Production
The design has been built by RS Sailing in the United Kingdom since 2017 and remains in production.

Design
The RS Neo is a recreational sailing dinghy, with the hull made from RS Comptec PE3 sandwich rotational moulded construction. It has a catboat rig with carbon fibre spars, with a free-standing, two-section mast. The hull has a raked stem, a plumb transom, a transom-hung aluminium alloy rudder controlled by a tiller with an extension and a retractable aluminium alloy daggerboard.

Factory options include a launching dolly and boat trailer.

Operational history
A description by West Coast Sailing described the Neo as, "a combination of boats - a sporty and fun singlehander - which is also durable and easy to own. The Neo is an inexpensive boat compared to other fiberglass options. Go faster than you'd expect, without spending double the amount on a race boat. Composite spars and advanced sail design on a stable and easily driven hull combine with the strong, low maintenance Rotomolded plastic construction. The Neo is a niche boat that’s accessible, affordable, and keeps things exciting."

See also
List of sailing boat types

Similar sailboats
Laser (dinghy)

References

External links

Dinghies
2010s sailboat type designs
Sailing yachts
Sailboat type designs by Paul Handley
Sailboat types built by RS Sailing